This article lists events that occurred during 1965 in Estonia.

Incumbents

Events
July 6 – trolleybuses begin operating in Tallinn.
Helsinki-Tallinn ferry resumes operation.
New Tallinn Bus Station was built.

Births
 11 October – Ivo Uukkivi, actor, singer and producer
 28 December – Allar Levandi, Nordic combined skier

Deaths

References

 
1960s in Estonia
Estonia
Estonia
Years of the 20th century in Estonia